György Cserhalmi (born 17 February 1948, in Budapest) is a Hungarian actor. He graduated from the Actors Academy in 1971.  He is also the founder of the Labdater Theatre in the Globe cultural centre.

Employment
1971: Debrecen Csokonai Theatre
1972-1975: Veszprem Petofi Theatre
1979-1983: National Theatre, then the Hungarian Film Company
1983-1989: Katona Jozsef Theatre
1989-1991: National Theatre
1991–present: freelance work.

Prizes
Kossuth Prize (1990)
SZOT prize (1988)
Elizabeth prize (1987)
Noteworthy artist (1986)
Balazs Bela prize (1982)

Films
Has acted in more than 200 films, since the early 1970s one of the most significant Hungarian contemporary actors, especially in modern heroic roles. One of the most significant being Mephisto, made in 1981 by Istvan Szabo. He starred in the 1976 film Azonosítás, which won the Silver Bear for an outstanding single achievement at the 26th Berlin International Film Festival.
He played a role in the 2002 Perlasca – Un eroe Italiano.

Stage roles
Shakespeare, Gorky, Sophocles, Goethe, Strindberg, Molière as well as Hungarian writers.

References

External links
 
 

1948 births
Living people
Hungarian male film actors
Hungarian male stage actors
Male actors from Budapest